Jane Bunford (26 July 1895 – 1 April 1922) was one of the tallest women ever measuring  at the time of her death (adjusted for spinal curvature). She was the tallest woman in the world during her lifetime.

Early life
Bunford's parents were John Bunford (14 March 1856 – 10 December 1916) and Jane Bunford (Nee Andrews) (April 1857 – 1934) of Bartley Green, Birmingham, UK. Her father was a metal caster.

Accident
According to the Guinness Book of Records at the age of 11, Bunford had a head injury. It is believed that the injury permanently damaged her pituitary gland, releasing an excess of growth hormone which sent her growth out of control.

School
Bunford attended St. Michael's Secondary School in Bartley Green. At school she displayed a talent for embroidery but the desks and chairs became too uncomfortable for her to sit at. A Mrs Booth who knew Bunford said it was difficult for her to get through the school doors. As a result of both factors, Bunford's parents took her out of school. Mrs Booth said Bunford had to have her shoes specially made at Halesowen as she had size 17 feet.

Later life 
Bunford rejected several opportunities to benefit financially from her size and appearance. She had straight long auburn hair. In her final years Bunford became a recluse. She hated the attention her size brought her, and her spine developed a severe curvature. Because of this, Bunford could not stand fully erect towards the end of her life. By the end of her life, Bunford was also in pain because of joint problems and other ailments. She often baby-sat young children in the area, as a favour for neighbours.

Death and funeral

It was estimated that she would have been , if she had not developed the spinal curvature.

Bunford died at her home in Jiggins Lane on 1 April 1922. According to her death certificate, Bunford died of hyperpituitarism and gigantism.

The funeral was held at St Michaels and All Angels Church, Bartley Green, on 5 April 1922. The Coffin had been locked in the Church overnight before the day of the funeral. Mrs. Booth claimed in February 1972 that no local people were allowed to enter the church. The story featured on ATV on 27 January 1972 and 14 March 1972.

See also
List of tallest people
Zeng Jinlian, the tallest female in medical history

References

External links
 Jane Bunford's memorial stone on Bartley Green Library wall

1895 births
1922 deaths
People from Birmingham, West Midlands
People with gigantism